Bobur Abdikholikov (Bobir Abdixoliqov, born 23 April 1997) is an Uzbekistani footballer who plays as a forward for Ordabasy and Uzbekistan national football team.

International career
In May 2017, Bobur played for the first time for the Uzbekistan national under-23 football team. In January 2018, together with the national team, he won the AFC U-23 Asian Cup in China, where he played in all the matches of his team, but mostly took to the field at the end of the matches, where he played together with the team captain Zabikhillo Urinboev. In the same year, at the Asian Games, he scored 1 goal in 4 matches. The following year, he remained the main player under the guidance of coach Ravshan Khaydarov, and also went to the Asian Youth Championship 2020, where he scored 1 goal in 6 matches. He scored more than 20 goals for the team, thanks to which he became one of the top scorers in this age category in the recent history of Uzbekistan.

He made his debut in the T-shirt of the national team of Uzbekistan on June 8, 2018 in a lost (0:3) friendly match against Uruguay , in which he replaced Zabikhillo Urinboev in the second half.

Career statistics

Club

References

External links
 

1997 births
People from Qashqadaryo Region
Living people
Uzbekistani expatriate footballers
Uzbekistan international footballers
Uzbekistan Super League players
Association football forwards
FC Nasaf players
FC Rukh Lviv players
FC Energetik-BGU Minsk players
FC Ordabasy players
Uzbekistani footballers
Expatriate footballers in Ukraine
Expatriate footballers in Belarus
Expatriate footballers in Kazakhstan
Uzbekistani expatriate sportspeople in Ukraine
Uzbekistani expatriate sportspeople in Belarus